The Electoral district of Murray was one of the sixteen electoral districts of the original unicameral Victorian Legislative Council of 1851 to 1856.

Murray was defined as: "Bounded on the south and west by the Counties of Evelyn and Anglesey and the River Goulburn to its junction with the Murray on the north and north-east by the River Murray and on the south-east by the dividing range (Alps)."

A new district, Ovens, was created in 1855 which was contained within the original boundaries of Murray.

From 1856 onwards, the Victorian parliament consisted of two houses, the Victorian Legislative Council (upper house, consisting of Provinces) and the Victorian Legislative Assembly (lower house).

Members of Murray
One member originally, two from 1853 when the Council was expanded.

 = resigned
Hervey went on to represent Eastern Province (November 1856 to July 1865) in the Victorian Legislative Council.
Murphy went on to represent the Electoral district of Murray Boroughs (November 1856 to December 1865) in the Victorian Legislative Assembly.

See also
 Electoral district of Murray (disambiguation)
 Parliaments of the Australian states and territories
 List of members of the Victorian Legislative Council

References

Former electoral districts of Victorian Legislative Council
1851 establishments in Australia
1856 disestablishments in Australia